This list of museums in Oregon encompasses museums defined for this context as institutions (including nonprofit organizations, government entities, and private businesses) that collect and care for objects of cultural, artistic, scientific, or historical interest and make their collections or related exhibits available for public viewing. Museums that exist only in cyberspace (i.e., virtual museums) are not included. Lists of Oregon institutions which are not museums are noted in the "See also" section, below.

Main list

Museums and organizations encompassed by Antique Powerland Museums
Antique Powerland Museums, according to its website, "encompasses 14 additional museums and heritage organizations operating in partnership", which are not listed in the sortable table above (except as noted):

 Antique Caterpillar Machinery Museum
 Antique Implement Society
 Branch 15 - Early Days Gas Engines & Tractor Association
 Brooks Historical Society Inc.
 Northwest Blacksmith Association
 Northwest Vintage Car and Motorcycle Museum
 Oregon Electric Railway Museum (listed above)

 Oregon Fire Service Museum and Learning Center
 Oregon Tractors Pullers, Inc.
 Oregon Two Cylinder Club
 Pacific Northwest Truck Museum (listed above)
 Western Steam Fiends Association, Inc.
 Willamette Valley Model Railroad Museum
 Willow Creek Railroad

Oregon regions
The region designations used in the table above follow the Oregon Museums Association regions (the state tourism authority uses slightly different regions):

 Central:
 All of Crook, Deschutes, Jefferson counties
 Most of Wasco County except the northern part (such as the communities along Interstate 84)
 Coast:
 All of Clatsop, Coos, Curry, Lincoln and Tillamook counties
 Western parts of Douglas County, including Scottsburg (on Highway 38); and western parts of Lane County including Mapleton (on Highway 126
 Eastern:
 All of Baker, Gilliam, Grant, Harney, Malheur, Morrow, Sherman County, Umatilla, Union, Wallowa, and Wheeler counties
 Mount Hood/The Gorge:
 All of Hood River County
 Parts of northern Wasco County, (including communities along Interstate 84), eastern parts of Multnomah and Clackamas counties, including areas east of U.S. Route 26 and communities along Interstate 84 east of Crown Point State Park, including Multnomah Falls and Bonneville.
 Portland Metro:
 All of Columbia and Washington counties
 Parts of Clackamas and Multnomah counties, including Sandy and Estacada and all areas west of them
 Southern:
 All of Jackson, Josephine, Klamath, Lake counties
 Most of Douglas County except Scottsburg and areas west of it
 Willamette Valley:
 All of Benton, Linn, Marion, Polk, and Yamhill counties
 Most of Lane County, except Mapleton and areas west of it

Alternate names and changed names
Museums are sometimes known by more than one name, and they sometimes change their names. Here are some known variations of the names of museums in the above list (which uses each museum's most widely known name):

 Gateway to Discovery — the name used by the North Coast Land Conservancy for the Gateway Coastal Natural History Center
 Coos County Historical Society Museum – Coos Historical and Maritime Museum (2004 name change)
 Coos-Curry Museum – later split into what now are the Coos Historical and Maritime Museum and Curry Historical Society Museum
 Deepwood Estate – see Historic Deepwood Estate
 Heritage Museum – see Clatsop County Historical Society Heritage Museum
 Historic Patrick Hughes House – see Patrick Hughes House
 Hughes Historic House – see Patrick Hughes House
 Jordan Valley Owyhee Heritage Council Museum – see I. O. N. Jordan Valley Heritage Museum
 Old College Hall
 Telephone Pioneers Museum – see Qwest Pioneer Telephone Museum
 Tillamook Naval Museum – see Tillamook Naval Air Station
 Wasco County Historical Museum – part of the Columbia Gorge Discovery Center
 Yamhill Museum — see Yamhill County Historical Society Museum

Defunct museums
 Columbia County Museum, St. Helens, As of March 2007, closed due to litigation
 Horner Museum, at Gill Coliseum in Corvallis, Oregon, closed 1995
 Jacksonville Museum, closed in 2009
Sage Museum, Shaniko
 Pacific Northwest Museum of Natural History, Ashland
 Working Wonders Children's Museum, Bend, closed in 2009
 Jensen Arctic Museum, Monmouth, closed in 2013, collection moved to the Museum of Natural and Cultural History (MNCH) at the University of Oregon in Eugene.
Pioneer Telephone Museum, Eugene, abruptly closed in 2016 for unknown reasons

See also
 List of museums in Portland, Oregon
 Nature Centers in Oregon
 Lists of Oregon-related topics

Notes

External links

 Oregon Museums Association
 AllOregon.com list of museums in the state

Oregon
 
Museums
Museums